Immokolee (also known as the Dorothy Binney Palmer House) is a historic home in Fort Pierce, Florida. It is located at 8431 Immokolee Road. On July 29, 1994, it was added to the U.S. National Register of Historic Places.

The name "Immokolee" derives from a Seminole dialect word meaning "our home" or "my home place."

The Mission Revival house was constructed in 1931 by local builder Franklind Tyler from a design provided by owner Dorothy Binney Palmer. The house was restored after Palmer's death in 1985.

References

Further reading
Whistled Like a Bird: The Untold Story of Dorothy Putnam, George Putnam, and Amelia Earhart, Sally Putnam Chapman (Warner Books, 1997)

Fort Pierce, Florida
Houses in St. Lucie County, Florida
Houses on the National Register of Historic Places in Florida
National Register of Historic Places in St. Lucie County, Florida